Leyla Everlasting is a 2020 Turkish comedy film directed by Ezel Akay and written by Akay, Adnan Yıldırım, Özlem Lale and Uğur Saatçi, starring Demet Akbağ, Haluk Bilginer, Elçin Sangu, Fırat Tanış and Alican Yücesoy. Originally to be theatrically released by BKM Film on March 20 2020, the film's distribution rights were sold to Netflix due to the COVID-19 pandemic. It was released on 4 December 2020 on Netflix.

Cast 
 Demet Akbağ - Leyla
 Haluk Bilginer - Adem
 Elçin Sangu - Nergis
 Fırat Tanış - Mahdum
 Alican Yücesoy - Haris
 Hakan Eke - Hızır 
 Emre Kıvılcım - Harun-Faruk
 İhsan Ceylan - İlyas 
 Hasan Eflatun Akay -
 Bertan Çelikkol -
 Kerime Obenik -
 Bimen Zartar - Dayı
 Reşit Berker Enhoş -
 Arda Cartı -

References

External links 
 
 
 Leyla Everlasting on Box Office Türkiye

2020 films
2020s Turkish-language films
Turkish-language Netflix original films
Turkish comedy films
Films shot in Istanbul
Films not released in theaters due to the COVID-19 pandemic
2020 comedy films